is a Japanese footballer who plays as a forward for  club, Nara Club.

Career

Youth Career
Asakawa begin youth career in with Chiba Amical SC, he graduated from the academy of JEF United Chiba, went through Yachiyo High School in Chiba Prefecture, and entered Toin University of Yokohama FC.

YSCC Yokohama
Asakawa joined J3 League club YSCC Yokohama in 2018. Although he did not participate in official matches in the first year, he became the main force in the second year with the change of manager, and left a result with 13 goals in 32 games.

Roasso Kumamoto
On 12 December 2019, He complete transfer to Roasso Kumamoto was announced. In the 2020 season, there were not many appearances in the starting lineup, and there were many games where Toshiki Takahashi entered as a substitute.  Still, he scored 11 goals and showed many strong scenes as a striker. On 6 December 2021, he was announced that would leave from club due to the expiry of his contract after two years at Kumamoto.

Nara Club
On 18 January 2022, Asakawa announcement officially transfer to JFL club, Nara Club for 2022 season. On 5 November at same year, Asakawa led his club to promotion to the J3 League for the first time in history after defeat Veertien Mie narrowly score 1-0 scored by teammate Sōtarō Yamamoto. 15 days later, Asakawa led his club to win the 2022 JFL season for the first time in history and was the top scorer with 16 goals in 27 matches. On 6 December at same year, Asakawa won the award as Player of the Year in 2022 as well as the Best XI in JFL Awards. 19 days later in the same month and year, Asakawa renewal contract with club for upcoming 2023 season.

Career statistics
.

Notes

Honours
 Roasso Kumamoto
 J3 League : 2021

 Nara Club 
 Japan Football League : 2022

 Individual
 JFL Top scorer : 2022
 JFL Player of the Year : 2022
 JFL Best XI : 2022

References

External links

1995 births
Living people
Association football people from Chiba Prefecture
Japanese footballers
Association football forwards
J3 League players
Japan Football League players
JEF United Chiba players
YSCC Yokohama players
Roasso Kumamoto players
Nara Club players